Panteleimon Alexandrovich Golosov (1882, Moscow – 1945, Moscow) was a Constructivist architect from the Soviet Union and brother of Ilya Golosov.

Career
Golosov graduated from the Moscow School of Painting, Sculpture and Architecture in 1911. From 1918 he taught at the State Free Artist Studios (Svomas), then at VKhUTEMAS and at the Moscow Architectural Institute. He later became a member of the OSA Group.

Selected works
1919 - Worked under Alexey Shchusev and Ivan Zholtovsky on Moscow City planning.
1923 - Series of pavilions for the All-Russian Agricultural and Handicraft Industries Exhibition, Moscow.
1924 - Competition entry for the Exposition Internationale des Arts Décoratifs et Industriels Modernes.
1930–1934 - Designed and built the headquarters and printing works for the Pravda newspaper, Moscow.

See also
OSA Group

References

External links
Moscow architecture preservation society

1882 births
1945 deaths
Burials at Novodevichy Cemetery
Constructivist architects
Soviet architects
Modernist architects
Academic staff of Vkhutemas
Moscow School of Painting, Sculpture and Architecture alumni